Panton Corbett ( – 22 November 1855) was an English Tory politician from Shropshire.

His family was a branch of the Norman Corbet family of Caus. Panton Corbett lived at Longnor Hall in Shropshire and Leighton Hall in Montgomeryshire.

He was elected at the 1820 general election as a Member of Parliament (MP) for Shrewsbury, having contested the seat unsuccessfully at a by-election in May 1819. He was re-elected in 1826, but was defeated at the 1830 general election.

He was High Sheriff of Shropshire in 1849.

His oldest surviving son Edward Corbett (1817–1895) was MP for South Shropshire from 1868 to 1877.

References

External links 
 

1785 births
1855 deaths
Tory MPs (pre-1834)
Members of the Parliament of the United Kingdom for constituencies in Shropshire
UK MPs 1820–1826
UK MPs 1826–1830
High Sheriffs of Shropshire